Iberolacerta martinezricai, Martinez-Rica's rock lizard, is a species of lizard in the family Lacertidae.

Etymology
The specific name, martinezricai, is in honor of Spanish herpetologist Juan Pablo Martinez-Rica.

Geographic range
I. martinezricai is endemic to Spain.

Habitat
The natural habitats of I. martinezricai are temperate forests and rocky areas.

Conservation status
I. martinezricai is threatened by habitat loss.

References

Further reading

Arribas OJ (1996). “Taxonomic revision of the Iberian ‘Archaeolacertae’ I.: A new interpretation of the geographical variation of ‘Lacerta’ monticola Boulenger, 1905 and ‘Lacerta’ cyreni Müller & Hellmich, 1937”. Herpetozoa 9 (1/2): 31–56. (Lacerta cyreni martinezricai, new subspecies, pp. 54–55).
Arribas, Oscar; Carranza, Salvador (2004). “Morphological and genetic evidence of the full species status of Iberolacerta cyreni martinezricai (Arribas,1996)”. Zootaxa 634: 1-24.

martinezricai
Endemic reptiles of the Iberian Peninsula
Reptiles described in 1996
Endemic fauna of Spain
Taxa named by Oscar J. Arribas
Taxonomy articles created by Polbot